Members of the Control Commission (CC) of the Workers' Party of Korea were elected by the 1st Plenary Session of a WPK Central Committee. In the two predecessor organisations, the Central Inspection Commission of the Workers' Party of North Korea (WPNK) and the Inspection Committee of the Workers' Party of South Korea (WPSK), members were elected by the party congress. Control Commission members were responsible for ensuring party discipline, enforcing and protecting the party rules, and punishing members who breached rules and regulations.

During the Kim Il-sung and Kim Jong-il era only three individuals out of 57 were re-elected to a second term as CC member. CC membership was the least stable of all Central Committee organs in this time period. Political scientist Dae-sook Suh argues that "At least two explanations can be made. The first is that the committee takes its job seriously and enforces the rules to the letter, criticizing the majority of the members of the Central Committee and thus creating a high rate of turnover, even in its own committee. The second is that this committee is not different from other committees, that appointment is political". If the former is correct then the main responsibility of CC members was to carry out the policies of the Supreme Leader. However, in the Kim Jong-un era, three individuals out of thirteen were re-elected for a second term.

Its last term, the seventh, was elected on 9 May 2016. The 2nd Plenary Session of the 7th WPK Central Committee dismissed Hong In-bom as CC chairman and appointed Jo Yon-jun in his place. According to Michael Madden of 38 North "Interestingly Jo [Yon Jun], OGD's most senior deputy director, was appointed Chairman of the Inspection Commission (a.k.a. the Control Commission), a position which is typically appointed to elderly and experienced OGD personnel (such as Mr Jo) who entering a period of semi-retirement." In 2019 it spearheaded an anti-corruption investigation in North Pyongan Province. A commentator quipped that "The inspection team arrived on December 20 and is continuing to investigate local government officials. [...] The team is looking at officials working in customs bureaus, factories and enterprises, and even in storage facilities." It was a highly unusual investigation; most Inspection investigations lasts for a couple of weeks but this one lasted for three months. The investigation was part of Kim Jong-un's anti-corruption campaign.

Title history

Officers

Chairman

First Vice Chair

Vice Chairman

Members

Noter

References

Citations

Bibliography
Books:
 
 
  

Dissertations:
 

6th Central Auditing Commission of the Workers' Party of Korea
1946 establishments in North Korea
2021 disestablishments in North Korea